HIP 100963 is a G-type star in the faint northern constellation of Vulpecula resembling the Sun. It has an apparent visual magnitude of approximately 7.1, making it generally too faint to be seen with the naked eye in most circumstances.

This star has a stellar classification of G5, making it a G-type star with an undetermined luminosity class. It has similar mass, temperature and chemical abundance to the Sun and was called a solar twin in a 2009 study, although its lithium abundance is three to four times that of the Sun and it is much younger.

Sun comparison
Chart compares the sun to HIP 100963.

References

Vulpecula
G-type main-sequence stars
100963
195034
Durchmusterung objects